The University hospitals of the Ruhr University of Bochum, German Universitätsklinikum der Ruhr-Universität Bochum, abbreviated UK RUB is a syndicate of six university hospitals and associated facilities of the Ruhr University of Bochum. Founded in 2008 by the merger of formally independent hospitals the UK RUB is now a major provider of health in the Ruhr Metropolitan Region treating over 400,000 patients per year with a strong commitment to research and teaching.

History

The Universitätsklinikum der Ruhr-Universität Bochum emerged from the Bochum Model, where several non state-owned hospitals in Bochum and the surrounding metropolitan area were appointed as teaching hospitals. This appointment was first intended to be a temporary solution to financial shortages and political problems in the development of the medical faculty in Bochum in the 1970s, especially after the Universitätsklinikum Essen was spun off from the Ruhr University in 1972 and integrated into the newly formed Universität-Gesamthochschule Essen.

In 1998 the cooperation between appointed hospitals and Ruhr University was permanently established. This was in September 2008 the basis for the foundation of the Verband Klinikum der Ruhr-Universität Bochum with coordinating tasks in clinical, scientific and didactical fields.

Locations

University teaching hospitals 
 Bergmannsheil University Hospitals Bochum
 Knappschaftskrankenhaus Bochum-Langendreer
 Katholisches Klinikum Bochum
 St. Josef-Hospital Bochum
 St. Elisabeth-Hospital Bochum
 St. Maria Hilf-Krankenhaus Bochum
 Klinik Blankenstein, Hattingen
 Marienhospital Herne, Herne
 LWL-Universitätsklinik Bochum
 Heart and Diabetes Center North Rhine-Westphalia (Herz- und Diabeteszentrum Nordrhein-Westfalen), Bad Oeynhausen

Additional hospitals and institutes 
 Klinik für Psychosomatische Medizin und Psychotherapie des LWL-Universitätsklinikums der Ruhr-Universität Bochum
 LWL-Universitätsklinik Hamm, Hamm
 Institut für Prävention und Arbeitsmedizin der Deutschen Gesetzlichen Unfallversicherung (research institute for prevention and occupational medicine / IPA)
 Institut für Pathologie der Ruhr-Universität Bochum (institute for pathology)

External academic teaching hospitals 
 Knappschaftskrankenhaus Dortmund
 Allgemeines Krankenhaus Hagen
 Knappschaftskrankenhaus Recklinghausen
 Prosper-Hospital Recklinghausen
 Marien-Hospital Witten

Competence centers based on interdisciplinary cooperation

References

External links
 Web site of the Ruhr University Hospitals
 Web site of the medical faculty of the Ruhr-Universität Bochum

University hospotals
Hospital networks
Teaching hospitals in Germany
Medical and health organisations based in North Rhine-Westphalia